In the Ballygawley land mine attack of 13 July 1983, four soldiers of the British Army's Ulster Defence Regiment (UDR) were killed by a  Provisional Irish Republican Army (IRA) land mine near Ballygawley in County Tyrone, Northern Ireland. The soldiers were travelling in a convoy of armoured vehicles when the land mine was detonated remotely.

Background
Since 1970, the IRA had been waging a guerrilla campaign against the British security forces in Northern Ireland. The IRA's East Tyrone Brigade was particularly active. The Irish Times reported: "This stretch of road has been a favourite ambush spot for successive generations of IRA men since the 1920s. [...] In March 1973 a British Army lieutenant was killed when his armoured car was blown up by a similar 500 lb landmine along the same road". In February 1983 the IRA shot dead an off-duty UDR soldier in Ballygawley.

Attack
On the morning of 13 July 1983, soldiers of the 6th Battalion UDR were travelling in a convoy of five armoured Land Rovers from St Lucia Barracks, Omagh to Ballykinler Barracks for a training exercise. As the convoy was about to begin the long descent down Ballymacilroy Hill into Ballygawley, a  land mine exploded under the last vehicle. It had been planted in a culvert underneath the road and detonated remotely. The blast threw the vehicle into the air and gouged a large crater in the road. Three soldiers were killed outright and a fourth died later in hospital. The soldiers killed were Ronald Alexander (19), Thomas Harron (25), John Roxborough (19), and Oswell Neely (20), all Protestants from Northern Ireland.

Two men received life sentences for the attack and for the killing of RUC officer Paul Clarke in Carrickmore four months later. In 1988, the IRA killed eight British soldiers in a bomb attack along the same road, in the Ballygawley bus bombing.

See also
Chronology of Provisional Irish Republican Army actions (1980–1989)
Dungannon land mine attack
Altnaveigh landmine attack
Warrenpoint ambush
Ballygawley bus bombing
1990 Downpatrick roadside bomb

References

Explosions in 1983
Military history of County Tyrone
1983 in Northern Ireland
Provisional IRA bombings in Northern Ireland
The Troubles in County Tyrone
British Army in Operation Banner
Military actions and engagements during the Troubles (Northern Ireland)
Mass murder in 1983
July 1983 events in the United Kingdom
1983 crimes in the United Kingdom
Ambushes in Northern Ireland